Winters House is a historic house in Sacramento, California.  It is a Victorian era Stick/Eastlake Queen Anne style wooden residence built in 1890 by businessman Herman Winters.

It was listed on the National Register of Historic Places in 1999.

See also
History of Sacramento, California
National Register of Historic Places listings in Sacramento County, California
California Historical Landmarks in Sacramento County, California

References

External links
Winters House, with photo from 2006, at Noehill
Rental info, at Sacramento Housing and Redevelopment Authority

Houses in Sacramento, California
Houses on the National Register of Historic Places in California
Queen Anne architecture in California
Stick-Eastlake architecture in California
Victorian architecture in California
National Register of Historic Places in Sacramento, California